Encanto is a 2021 American computer-animated film.

Encanto may also refer to:

Music
 Encanto, the former musical group of American Tejano musician Laura Canales
 Encanto (album), 2008, the thirty-sixth studio album by Brazilian musician Sérgio Mendes
 Encanto (soundtrack), 2021, the soundtrack album to the 2021 film of the same name
 Encanto (EP), 2013, an EP by Lantana
 "El Encanto" (song), a tune by Charles Lloyd; see A Night in Copenhagen

Places
 Encanto, Rio Grande do Norte, Brazil; a municipality located in Rio Grande do Norte, Brazil
 El Encanto Lake, a seasonal lake on the border of Bolivia and Brazil
 El Encanto, Amazonas, Colombia; a town and municipality on the Caraparaná River
 El Encanto, Pital, San Carlos, Costa Rica
 Encanto, Phoenix, Arizona, USA; one of the 15 urban villages that make up the city of Phoenix, in Arizona
 Encanto, San Diego, California, USA; a hilly urban neighborhood located in the southeastern region of San Diego, California
 El Encanto Falls, Canaima National Park, Bolivar, Venezuela; a waterfall

Facilities and structures
 El Encanto Hotel, Santa Barbara, California, USA; a hotel
 El Encanto Estates, Tucson, Arizona, USA; see List of historic properties in Tucson, Arizona
 El Encanto, Monterey Park, California, USA
 El Encanto department store, Havana, Cuba; that was destroyed in the 1961 El Encanto fire
 El Encanto Airport (IATA airport code ECO), El Encanto, Colombia; see List of airports by IATA airport code: E
 Encanto Dam, Tlapacoyan, Veracruz, Mexico; see List of power stations in Mexico

Train stations
 Encanto/62nd Street station, a San Diego Trolley station in California, USA
 Encanto/Central Avenue station, a Valley Metro light rail station in Arizona, USA
 El Encanto (Venezuela), a train station on the Great Venezuela Railway in Venezuela

Parks
 Encanto Park, Phoenix, Arizona, USA; a public park
 El Encanto (Venezuela), a park created from a portion of the Great Venezuela Railway

Other uses
 Anito (also encanto), ancestor spirits, nature spirits, and deities in the indigenous Philippine folk religions
 Encanto Formation, Mexico; a geologic formation
 Encanto, a brand of food from Mexilink

See also

 Isla del encanto (the Enchanted Isle), Spanish-language nickname for the Spanish-speaking locality of Puerto Rico, USA
 Tierra del Encanto (the Enchanted Land), Spanish-language nickname for New Mexico, USA